St. Stephens Church is an unincorporated community in King and Queen County, Virginia, United States.

Plantation houses Bewdley and Farmington, and the Marriott School, are listed on the National Register of Historic Places.

Notable buried individuals

References

Unincorporated communities in Virginia
Unincorporated communities in King and Queen County, Virginia